Łukasz Piotr Piszczek (born 3 June 1985) is a Polish professional footballer who plays for III liga club Goczałkowice-Zdrój. He is primarily positioned as a right-back, but is capable of playing as a centre-back.

He began his senior career as a footballer by joining Hertha Berlin in 2004. He played on loan for the Ekstraklasa club Zagłębie Lubin until 2007 when he returned to Hertha and was deployed as a right back. Between 2010–2021, he played for the German club Borussia Dortmund appearing in 363 official matches for the club, winning two consecutive Bundesliga titles in 2011 and 2012, three DFB-Pokal Cups, three DFL-Supercups as well as reaching the 2013 UEFA Champions League Final. He used to be a Poland national team member, making his debut in 2007 and going on to receive over 60 caps. He was also selected for four tournaments during his time with the national team, playing in three UEFA European Championships and the 2018 FIFA World Cup.

He confirmed his retirement from international football in 2018 following the conclusion of the FIFA World Cup. However, in November 2019 he made one more competitive appearance for the national team, informally dubbed his farewell game. In 2021 he decided to return to Goczałkowice-Zdrój, the Polish club where he started his football career as a junior.

Club career

Goczałkowice-Zdrój
Piszczek's father, Kazimierz, the coach of the local football club of Goczałkowice-Zdrój, decided to bring him to one of the training sessions at the age of about 7–8.

Gwarek Zabrze
Piszczek began his career as a striker. In 2001, he joined Gwarek Zabrze, coached by Vincent Soshinski, where he broke many goalscoring records at junior level and in 2003 won the Polish youth championship. In 2004, he became the top scorer at the 2004 UEFA European Under-19 Championship, along with the Turk Ali Öztürk.

Zagłębie Lubin
Hertha BSC was attracted by his performances and promptly signed Piszczek in 2004, but then immediately loaned him out to Zagłębie Lubin. He made his debut on 16 October 2004, in a 7–0 win against GKS Katowice, scoring and assisting a goal for Wojciech Łobodziński in the process. With Zagłębie, he won the 2006–07 Ekstraklasa playing mainly as a left winger in 4–3–3 formation, with Łobodziński on the right wing and Michał Chałbiński in the centre, although he was also utilized as a centre forward. He scored 11 goals in 2006–07 season, becoming the league's third best scorer after Chałbiński, who scored 12, and Piotr Reiss, who scored 15.

Hertha BSC

In the fall of 2007, after three years with Zagłębie Lubin, Hertha recalled Piszczek back to the club. He scored his first goal in the Bundesliga on 26 April 2008, to earn one point against Hannover 96.

Piszczek missed most of the first half of the 2008–09 season as the result of a hip problem that eventually required surgery. He began training again in February 2009 but in March suffered a setback due to a minor knee injury. He returned to Bundesliga action in April. At Hertha, Piszczek initially played as an offensive midfielder or on left wing, but in his second season, he started to appear at right-back after an injury to Arne Friedrich. After Friedrich recovered, Piszczek lost his place in the starting line-up, but reclaimed it in 2009–10, when Friedrich moved to centre-back.

Borussia Dortmund

On 19 May 2010, Piszczek moved to Borussia Dortmund on a free transfer, signing a contract until June 2013. On 26 July 2011, he signed a contract extension to keep him at the club until June 2016. On 24 September 2011, he scored his first goal for his new German club, a last-minute volley to win the match away to Mainz 05 2–1. In the 2012–13 season for Dortmund, Piszczek appeared in 11 out of 12 matches of Dortmund's road to the UEFA Champions League Final in 2013. He also started the final at right-back against Bayern Munich, but Dortmund lost by one goal after Arjen Robben scored an 89th-minute winner for Bayern. On 27 January 2016, Piszczek signed a contract extension to keep him at the club until 2018. On 6 April 2017, he extended his contract with Dortmund until 30 June 2019.

On 13 March 2018, Borussia Dortmund announced that the club had reached an agreement with Piszczek for a contract extension which will keep him at the club until 30 June 2020. Piszczek also announced that he would retire from professional football at the end of his contract, a claim he later clarified saying he's still "not certain". On 20 May 2020, Piszczek pushed back his retirement plans by signing a one-year contract extension with Borussia Dortmund, keeping him at the club until 2021.

Return to Goczałkowice-Zdrój
In May 2021, Piszczek announced his return to his hometown club Goczałkowice-Zdrój.

International career

Piszczek made his debut for the Poland national team in a friendly match against Estonia on 3 February 2007.

On 6 June 2008, he was selected for the final 23-man squad for UEFA Euro 2008, replacing Jakub Błaszczykowski, who was left out through injury. He made one appearance at the tournament, coming on a substitute against Germany, but after receiving a training injury, did not play in the next match and had no further role in the tournament.

On 29 July 2011, the Polish Football Association gave a six-month suspension on Piszczek for participation in the fixing of a 2006 match against KS Cracovia match, in which he did not play. In September 2011, the suspension was cancelled.

Piszczek was selected for the final 23-man squad for UEFA Euro 2012. He played in all three group games for Poland. On 22 March 2013, Piszczek scored his first goal for the national team in a 1–3 defeat to Ukraine. Four days later, he scored in a 5–0 win over San Marino.

He was also selected for the final 23-man squad for UEFA Euro 2016. Piszczek made his 50th appearance for the national team in the quarter-final match against Portugal, which Poland lost. Piszczek was selected for the final 23-man squad for the 2018 FIFA World Cup. However, following a disappointing tournament performance with Poland, Piszczek confirmed his retirement from international football.

In November 2019, he was named to the national team for Euro 2020 qualifying matches with Israel and Slovenia. He started the Slovenia match in what was dubbed his farewell game, and received a standing ovation from supporters and a guard of honour from his fellow players when he was subbed off just before half time. Poland went on to win the match 3–2.

Personal life
Piszczek was born in Czechowice-Dziedzice, Bielsko, and raised in Goczałkowice-Zdrój. His father, Kazimierz, who worked as a coach at Goczałkowice-Zdrój, later became the vice-president of that club. His brothers, Marek and Adam were also involved in football.

Piszczek married his fiancée Ewa Kryjom in June 2009. The couple's daughters, Sara and Nel, were born on 3 March 2011 and 15 February 2016 respectively.

Career statistics

Club

International

International goals
Scores and results list Poland's goal tally first.

Honours

Club
Zagłębie Lubin
 Ekstraklasa: 2006–07

Borussia Dortmund
 Bundesliga: 2010–11, 2011–12
 DFB-Pokal: 2011–12, 2016–17, 2020–21
 DFL-Supercup: 2013, 2014, 2019
 UEFA Champions League runner-up: 2012–13

Individual
 Bundesliga Team of the Season: 2015–16, 2016–17

References

External links

Łukasz Piszczek at football-lineups.com

Bundesliga profile

1985 births
Living people
People from Czechowice-Dziedzice
Polish footballers
Association football midfielders
Poland international footballers
Association football utility players
UEFA Euro 2008 players
UEFA Euro 2012 players
Ekstraklasa players
Polish expatriate footballers
Expatriate footballers in Germany
Bundesliga players
LKS Goczałkowice-Zdrój players
Hertha BSC players
Borussia Dortmund players
Polish expatriate sportspeople in Germany
Zagłębie Lubin players
Sportspeople from Silesian Voivodeship
UEFA Euro 2016 players
2018 FIFA World Cup players